First India News is a regional news channel based in Rajasthan, India. It was launched in 2013. Rajasthan No 1 Channel

Associated journalists
CMD Mr. Jagdeesh Chandra
Director Mr. Virendra Choudhary

Shows
The New JC Show
 Big Fight Live
 Jawab Toh Dena Padega
 Janta Ka Mood
 Face to Face
 Good Luck Tips
 Bhoole Bisre Nagme
 Ghoomar Nakhrali
 Jungle Live

References

External links
 

Hindi-language television channels in India
Television channels and stations established in 2012
Hindi-language television stations
Television stations in India
Television channels based in Noida
Television channels and stations established in 2013
2013 establishments in Rajasthan